"My Pretty One" is a song recorded by English singer Cliff Richard and released in the UK in June 1987 as the lead single from his Always Guaranteed album. The song reached number 6 in the UK Singles Chart.
The song was written by Alan Tarney who had previously written some of Richard's most successful tracks since his 1976 renaissance, including "We Don't Talk Anymore", "Dreamin'", "A Little in Love" and "Wired for Sound". The song was originally recorded and released by Jamie Rae in 1985 as Pretty One.

Track listing
UK 7" Single (EM 4)
"My Pretty One"
"Love Ya"

UK 12" Single (12EM 4)
"My Pretty One" (Extended Version)
"Love Ya"
"Under the Gun"

Chart performance

References

1987 singles
1987 songs
Cliff Richard songs
Songs written by Alan Tarney
Song recordings produced by Alan Tarney